"Wait 'til My Bobby Gets Home" is a song written by Phil Spector, Ellie Greenwich and Jeff Barry.  It was recorded at Gold Star Studios in Los Angeles in May 1963 by Darlene Love with the lead vocals shared by  Love and her sister Edna Wright.  The song was arranged by Jack Nitzsche, Larry Levine was the engineer and Spector's Wall of Sound was played by The Wrecking Crew.

The record was released later in 1963 as Philles Records #114 and peaked at #26 in the Billboard Top 100.

The song was covered by Motown's Martha and the Vandellas for their  1963 album Heat Wave, as well as by British singer Beverley Jones that same year. Ellie Greenwich recorded her own version in 1973.

References

1963 singles
1963 songs
Songs written by Phil Spector
Songs written by Jeff Barry
Songs written by Ellie Greenwich
Song recordings produced by Phil Spector
Song recordings with Wall of Sound arrangements
Philles Records singles